The 2011 UCI Mountain Bike & Trials World Championships was the 22nd edition of the UCI Mountain Bike & Trials World Championships and was held in Champéry, Switzerland.

Medal summary

Men's events

Women's events

Team events

Medal table

See also
2011 UCI Mountain Bike World Cup

References

External links

Official website

 
UCI Mountain Bike World Championships
UCI Mountain Bike World Championships
2011 UCI Mountain Bike World Championships
UCI Mountain Bike World Championships
Mountain biking events in Switzerland